Djama Robleh (born December 31, 1958) is a retired Djiboutian long-distance runner who specialized in the marathon race.

He won the silver medal in this event at the 1982 African Championships and finished eighth in the marathon at the 1984 Summer Olympics. In addition he placed 47th at the 1983 World Championships, took third in the 1985 World Marathon Cup (in which his team finished first), and entered the 1987 World Championships without finishing the race.

His personal best time came as he trailed Steve Jones to a second-place finish in the 1985 Chicago Marathon. Robleh's time was 2:08:08, a winning time for most year, but Jones ran a near-world record at the race, clocking a 2:07:17.

The current Djiboutian record is held by Ahmed Salah with 2:07:07 hours.

Achievements

References

External links
sports-reference

1958 births
Living people
Djiboutian male marathon runners
Athletes (track and field) at the 1984 Summer Olympics
Olympic athletes of Djibouti